Philip Harold Ernest Goodrich (2 November 1929 – 22 January 2001) was an Anglican bishop in the late 20th century. He was Bishop of Tonbridge from 1973 to 1982 and Bishop of Worcester from 1982 to 1996.

Early life
Born on 2 November 1929 he was educated at Stamford School and St John's College, Cambridge.

Religious life
After this he studied for ordination at Ripon College Cuddesdon followed by a curacy at Rugby in Warwickshire. Between 1957 and 1961 he was chaplain of St John's College, Cambridge (his own university college) before incumbencies at South Ormsby and Bromley.

In 1973, he was ordained to the episcopate as Bishop of Tonbridge, a suffragan bishop in the Diocese of Rochester. He was translated to the Diocese of Worcester in 1982 where he would serve as Bishop of Worcester, the diocesan bishop. He retired in 1996.

He died on 22 January 2001. His ashes are buried in the cloisters of Worcester Cathedral.

References

1929 births
2001 deaths
People educated at Stamford School
Alumni of St John's College, Cambridge
Alumni of Ripon College Cuddesdon
Bishops of Tonbridge
Bishops of Worcester
20th-century Church of England bishops
Burials at Worcester Cathedral